Reading is a surname. Notable people with the surname include:

Bertice Reading (1933–1991), American singer
Burnet Reading (1749–1838), English engraver
John Reading (disambiguation), several people of the name
Peter Reading (1946–2011), English poet
Pierson B. Reading (1816–1868), American pioneer

English-language surnames
English toponymic surnames